The samuhakalahom was one of the two chief ministers in the historical Chatusadom government system of Siam (now Thailand) in use from the Ayutthaya through early Rattanakosin periods. The post was originally charged with military affairs but later oversaw both civil and military affairs in southern cities. Officials who held the post usually received the noble title of Mahasena.

List of samuhakalahom

Rattanakosin
Chaophraya Mahasena (Pli): Served King Rama I, from 1782.
Chaophraya Mahasena (Bunnag): Served Rama I until his own death in 1805. He was the progenitor of the Bunnag family, which would become one of the most powerful noble families, with multiple descendants also holding the post.
Chaophraya Mahasena (Pin): Served during the reign of Rama I.
Chaophraya Mahasena (Bunma): Served until his death during the reign of Rama II.
Chaophraya Wongsasurasak (Saeng): Served until his death in 1822.
Chaophraya Mahasena (Sang): Served kings Rama II and Rama III.
Chaophraya Mahasena (Noi): Served until his death in 1830.
Somdet Chaophraya Borom Maha Prayurawong (Dis Bunnag): 1851–1855. He served both as kalahom and phra khlang, and held an especially esteemed position, with a sakdina of 30,000.
Somdet Chaophraya Borom Maha Si Suriwong (Chuang Bunnag): 1855–1882. He was one of the most powerful men in the kingdom, and would become regent during the early years of Chulalongkorn's reign. He had a sakdina of 30,000.
Chaophraya Surawongwaiwat (Won Bunnag): Served until his death in 1888.
Chaophraya Rattanathibet (Phum): Held the position until its abolition.

See also
 List of samuhanayok
 List of Defence Ministers of Thailand

References

Thai nobility
Lists of political office-holders in Thailand